State Duma may refer to:

 State Duma, the lower house of the Federal Assembly of Russia
 State Duma (Russian Empire), the lower house of the Russian Imperial parliament
 State Duma of Stavropol Krai, Russian regional parliament
 State Duma of Astrakhan Oblast, Russian regional parliament
 Legislative Duma of Tomsk Oblast, formerly State Duma of Tomsk Oblast, Russian regional parliament
 State Duma of Yaroslavl Oblast, Russian regional parliament
 State Duma of Yamalo-Nenets Autonomous Okrug, Russian regional parliament